The 1947 Georgia Bulldogs football team was an American football team that represented the University of Georgia in the Southeastern Conference (SEC) during the 1947 college football season. In its ninth season under head coach Wally Butts, the team compiled a 7–4–1 record (3–3 against SEC opponents), tied for fifth place in the SEC, and outscored opponents by a total of 212 to 135. The team was invited to play in the 1948 Gator Bowl on New Year's Day, playing Maryland to a 20–20 tie.

Quarterback John Rauch led the team on offense. He was inducted into the College Football Hall of Fame in 2003.

Three Georgia players received honors from the Associated Press (AP) on the 1947 All-SEC football team: end Dan Edwards (AP-1); quarterback John Rauch (AP-2); and guard Herbert St. John (AP-2).

Schedule

Source: Sports Reference: 1947 Georgia football schedule

References

Georgia
Georgia Bulldogs football seasons
Georgia Bulldogs football